is the 9th and final studio album by Cute. It was released on 23 December 2015 on the label Zetima.

Release 
The album was released in 3 versions: Regular Edition, Limited Edition A (CD+DVD), and Limited Edition B (CD+Blu-ray). The limited editions contained an additional DVD or Blu-ray disc, while the regular edition had one additional (20th) track on the CD.

Reception 
The album debuted at number eight in the Japanese Oricon weekly albums chart.

Track listing

Charts

References

External links 
 Profile of the album on the Hello! Project official website

Cute (Japanese idol group) albums
2015 albums
Zetima albums
Japanese-language albums
Electropop albums
Dance-pop albums by Japanese artists